Evelyn Walton Ordway (30 January 1853 – 9 March 1928), was an American chemist, suffragist and university professor. She was a chemistry and physics professor at Newcomb College for seven years and was active in the Louisiana women's suffrage movement, becoming the first president of the Louisiana State Suffrage Association.

Biography 
Evelyn M. Walton was born on 30 January 1853 to  Sarah Elizabeth Davis  and her husband John Burrill Walton. She studied at Massachusetts Institute of Technology (MIT) as part of the 1881 class gaining a Bachelor of Science degree. While at MIT she published a paper on her research and this was discussed in the Annual Reports of the Smithsonian. She was later appointed as an assistant at MIT. After her marriage in 1882 she was employed as the Professor of Chemistry and Physics at Newcomb College of Tulane University. She served in that position from 1887 to 1904 after which she was appointed as the Professor of Chemistry at Newcomb, a post she held until 1905.

Ordway was a member of the American Association of University Women and in March 1883 delivered a paper to that organisation on the Industrial Education of Women. At the World Cotton Centennial in 1884, Ordway organized a collective exhibit of the scientific work done by women in botany, mineralogy, entomology, astronomy, chemistry, zoology, architecture, and ethnology.

In 1892 Ordway became involved with the Louisiana women's suffrage movement. She helped form the women's suffrage club The Portia and was appointed the club's treasurer with Caroline E. Merrick being appointed president.  Two years later Ordway would attend the 26th Annual Convention of the National American Woman Suffrage Association being held in Washington, D.C. and while there discussed The Portia, a suffrage club gaining popularity in Louisiana along with the benefits to women in Louisiana should they gain the vote. In 1896 Ordway founded the Era Club. This club merged with the Portia Club in 1900 and Ordway became the first president of the resulting Louisiana State Suffrage Association. She continued to work closely with Kate M. Gordon who would later succeed her in holding the presidency of the Association. By 1900 Ordway was also the President Women's Branch Alliance, Unitarian Church, as well as the secretary of the board of the New Orleans Free Kindergarten Association. Ordway was active in campaigning for and raising awareness of the benefits to women in having the vote and gave lectures including one at the Free Church of the Annunciation in New Orleans in 1901. She also wrote articles documenting the history of the suffrage movement in New Orleans.

She retired from her position as Professor of Chemistry in 1905 and, after the death of her husband in 1909, moved first to Saugus and then Lynn.

Family 
Ordway married her husband Professor John Morse Ordway in 1882.

Death 
Ordway died on 9 March 1928.

References 

1853 births
1928 deaths
American women chemists
American suffragists
Massachusetts Institute of Technology alumni
American women academics
Scientists from New Orleans
19th-century American chemists
19th-century American women scientists
20th-century American chemists
20th-century American academics
20th-century American women scientists
Activists from New Orleans